MTV Roadies X4 : Your Gang, Your Glory  is the thirteenth season of Indian reality show MTV Roadies. The show is hosted by Gaelyn Mendonca. It started airing on MTV India from 20 February 2016. The audition episodes were aired from 20 February 2016 and the journey episodes began airing on 6 April 2016. Balraj was announced as the winner on 19 June 2016. Its auditions were held in various cities of India, like Chandigarh, Delhi, Pune and Lucknow. The audition was done by the four aspiring gang leaders - Rannvijay Singha, Karan Kundrra, Neha Dhupia and Sushil Kumar. After a prestigious finale, Balraj was crowned the Roadies X4 title.

Roadies' selection

Culling process 

Total count:

Battleground 
It is an online selection process in which participants are given various tasks to perform in order to get shortlisted.  Five male contestants, namely Sarthak, Mansvi, Sukhvinder, Subhash, Shivam along with two wildcard female entrants, Benafsha and Stacy are shortlisted.

Contestants 
There were originally 20 contestants at the beginning of the journey. Battleground winner contestant Benafsha Soonawalla entered in episode 6, and Shivangi Walia replaced Kavya Khurana in episode 9, bringing the total contestant number to 22.

The Total Votes is the number of votes a roadie has received during Vote-outs where the roadie is eligible to be eliminated from the game. It does not include the votes received during the finale where the finalists are voted for the win.

Gang Overview

Task summary

Voting History 

 Gang Prince
 Gang Neha
 Gang Karan
 Gang Ranvijay

 Indicates the contestant was immune that week.
 Indicates the contestant was nominated for a vote-out.
 Indicates the contestant was eliminated that week.
 The contestant quit the competition
 Indicates the contestant wild card entry in the competition.
 Indicates the contestant was eliminated outside vote out that week.
 Indicates the contestant is the runner up.
 Indicates the contestant won the competition.

 Note
 -Due to winning the first task, Karan was asked to grant one immunity to any other gang leader. Consequently, he chose Neha. 
 - A double vote-out occurred after which, Prince and Karan were given an option to either eliminate one member from their gang or to go for a regular vote-out. If a gang leader chooses to use the power of elimination by himself, then the votes that are against his gang would become null; and he will only lose one gang member. Karan chose to use the power and eliminates Mahamedhaa from the competition, while Prince went for a regular vote-out. Eventually, Bharti got voted out.
 -A triple vote-out was announced and the losing gang leaders got to immune one member from their respective gangs each. The roadies had to vote against two members from the fellow losing gangs. After getting the maximum votes, Balraj, Divya and Tej got voted-out. It was then revealed that one of them can fight their place back. Prince, due to winning the task gets the opportunity to save one. He chose Divya after which Balraj and Tej got eliminated simultaneously. 
 -Gang leaders had to cast a vote-in between one of the battleground winners, Benafsha and Manasvi. Benafsha entered the competition unanimously. Divya, who was given a chance after last vote-out competed in a face-off task against Manasvi. Divya managed to win the task and secured her spot, while Manasvi got eliminated. 
 -An internal gang vote-out occurs with Kavya, Ocean, and Sunny getting voted-out. After which, it was announced that they are only nominated for a vote-out. A single vote-out occurs, with Satish's vote was counted twice due to winning an advantage earlier. Due to illness, Anseela was absent in the vote-out and her vote was cast by her gang leader Neha. 
 -Kavya forfeited the competition due to ligament injury. She is replaced by Shivangi who joined the competition. The voted-out roadie in this vote out had to choose another who gets eliminated with them. Ocean, being the voted-out roadie, selects Tarasha to eliminate from the competition.  
 -Karishma, due to winning the previous task was granted a power to nominate one from her own gang for the vote-out. She nominated Hifsa. 
 -Shivangi was eliminated directly by Karan as a result of losing a bet in a task. All the other members of gang Karan became immune from the vote-out. 
 -Neha and Ranvijay's gang had to nominate one member for the vote-out. Rubal from gang Ranvijay being the only immune member, nominates Hifsa, thereby saving Karishma from the vote-out. 
 -Balraj, Bharti, Rohan and Tarasha re-entered and challenged Saad, Anamika, Satish and Hifsa respectively. Tarasha and Balraj won, replacing Hifsa and Saad respectively from the competition. Bharti and Rohan lost and got eliminated again.  
 -Winning gang leader Ranvijay was given a power to immune one roadie.

Sponsors 
The 13th season MTV Roadies X4 is powered by Park Avenue Deodorants and Big Boy Toyz. It is connected by Hike Messenger and it is in association with United Group of Institutions and Macho Badey Aaram Se!!. Ayurwin Nutrigain is its fitness partner and 93.5 Red FM Bajatey Raho! and Tissot Swiss Watches are also included in the sponsors. The tagline of the show is  Your Gang, Your Glory

References

MTV Roadies
2016 Indian television seasons